George Lisle "Sam" Loucks (July 9, 1915 – August 4, 1992) was an American professional basketball player. He played for the Columbus Athletic Supply in the National Basketball League for nine games during their 1937–38 season and averaged 4.1 points per game. Lillge also played in the Amateur Athletic Union for various teams. He also was in military service between 1942-1945 for the United States Air Corps, after which he went back to play In the AAU.

References

1915 births
1992 deaths
Amateur Athletic Union men's basketball players
American men's basketball players
Basketball players from Ohio
Centers (basketball)
Columbus Athletic Supply players
Forwards (basketball)
Otterbein Cardinals men's basketball players
People from Fairfield, Ohio